Euphorbia verruculosa is a species of plant in the family Euphorbiaceae. It is endemic to Namibia.  Its natural habitats are rocky areas and cold desert.

References

Endemic flora of Namibia
verruculosa
Least concern plants
Taxonomy articles created by Polbot
Taxa named by N. E. Brown